CFSA stands for:

Carolina Farm Stewardship Association, an organic farming advocacy group
Skate Canada, formerly known as the Canadian Figure Skating Association
Certified Financial Services Auditor
Community Financial Services Association of America, an industry association for payday lenders